Hiraoka may refer to:

Hiraoka (surname), a Japanese surname
Hiraoka Station (disambiguation), multiple train stations in Japan
Hiraoka Dam, a dam in Nagano Prefecture, Japan
Hiraoka Shrine, a Shinto shrine in Osaka Prefecture, Japan
11072 Hiraoka, a main-belt asteroid